Acrocercops geologica is a moth of the family Gracillariidae, known from Sri Lanka. It was described by Edward Meyrick in 1908.

References

geologica
Moths of Asia
Moths described in 1908